

Friedrich Schilcher (1811 – 1881) was an Austrian portrait, genre, and history painter, and decorative designer.

Schilcher was born in Vienna on 1 September 1811. He studied at the Vienna Academy, undertook study trips to Hungary and Transylvania, and became the president of Vienna Künstlerhaus. He died on 6 May 1881 at Unterdöbling in Vienna, and was buried in the Vienna Central Cemetery. In 1975 the Schilchergasse (street), in Vienna's 14th borough of Penzing, was named after him.

Works
 restoration of ceiling frescoes by Marcantonio Chiarini in the Winter Palace of Prince Eugene, Innere Stadt, Vienna (1841)
 restoration of ceiling frescoes in the Great Boardroom of Palais Niederösterreich, Vienna
 stage curtain for the Hungarian National Theatre, Budapest
 altarpiece for the Ladislauskirche, Oradea, Romania
 Cardinal virtues, frescoes in the prelate courtyard of Melk Abbey (1852)
 Glory of Saint Benedict, ceiling painting for the entrance hall at Melk Abbey (1852)
 The circular dance of angels, painting behind the high altar at St Joseph's Church in Kahlenberg, Vienna (1852)
 painting for the Finsterle family mausoleum in the parish cemetery at Kahlenbergerdorf in Döbling, Vienna
 decoration in the parish church of Leobersdorf (1859-1862)
 portrait of Franz Joseph I of Austria of Austria (1860), oil on canvas, 123 × 95 cm
 ceiling painting in the 'Schubert Room' at the Palais Dumba, Vienna, depicting aspects of Schubert's work, for Nikolaus Dumba 
 supraport frescoes for the Palais Schwarzenberg, Vienna
 figurative painting for the curtain of the Theater an der Wien (1864) 
 Allegory of Austria, fresco in the Great Dining Room of the Austria Classic Hotel Wien, Vienna (destroyed 1945)
 portrait of Johann II, Prince of Liechtenstein (Collection Liechtenstein, inv. No. GE 1841), oil on canvas, 55.4 × 47.4 cm

Further paintings are in the Vienna Museum and the Academy of Fine Arts Vienna.

Bibliography

References

External links 

 "Works of Art", Friedrich Schilcher (österreichisch, 1811–1881), on Artnet

Artists from Vienna
19th-century Austrian painters
19th-century Austrian male artists
Austrian male painters
1811 births
1881 deaths